Mukkunnu is a village in Pariyaram Panchayath near Taliparamba in the Indian state of Kerala.

Overview 
Mukkunnu is part of Pariyaram panchayath, Taliparamba Taluk. The name mukkunnu coming from moonu kunnu.  The drift of the Kuppam river, with the coconut lagoons and paddy fields, offers a breathtaking landscape. Mukkunnu can be reached either from the Chudala bus stop on National Highway (NH17) or through the North Kupam bus stop.

Temples 
There are two main temples in Mukkunnu. One is the Anakkeel Bhagavathi temple, near Kuppam. The festival of Anakkeel temple is in the month of January every year, several forms of theyyams (ritual dance) are also performed every year. Another temple is the Karode Vishnu temple. This is situated on the western side of Mukkunnu. Daily poojas are performed in this temple. Another devastana is the 'Gulikan Sthana' near the public library. There is an age-old 'Arayal' tree here. "Mukkunnu Nagam" is another divine temple where Theyyam is performed. Though there was no Theyyam in that Nagam for several years, it was reinstated again in 2013.

Public Library 
Mukkunnu has a Public Library which hosts a collection of Malayalam literary works. This public library had played a role before the penetration and accessibility of media to many households as it has provided a medium through which people have been accessing radio (late '70s), television (from early '80s), many leading newspapers and magazines published in Kerala.

Nava Kerala Kalasamithi
Navakerala Kalasamithi was formed in 1956. In 1960s and 1970s Navakerala Kalasamithi was famous in performing stage drama. P.K.Krishnan, C.Narayanan, M.V.R.Panikar, Kunhambu Vydiar, O,V.Kannan and V.V.Gopalan were the office bearers in early stage. Now K.Prakasan is the president and N.Saseendran is the secretary. The existing building of Navakerala kalasamithi mukkunnu built  in the year of 1987. One of the festivals conducted every year by Kalasamithi is Onam festival.

’Agriculture'

Paddy cultivation is the main agriculture Cultivation in mukkunnu. Coconut, and Vegetables are cultivating in this area.

Transportation
The national highway passes through Taliparamba town. Goa and Mumbai can be accessed on the northern side and Cochin and Thiruvananthapuram can be accessed on the southern side.  Taliparamba has a good bus station and buses are easily available to all parts of the Kannur district.  The road to the east of Iritty connects to Mysore and Bangalore.  But buses to these cities are available only from Kannur, 22 km to the south. The nearest railway stations are Kannapuram  and Kannur on the Mangalore-Palakkad line. 
Trains are available to almost all parts of India subject to advance booking over the internet.  There are airports at Kannur, Mangalore and Calicut. All of them are small international airports with direct flights available only to Middle Eastern countries.

See also
 Taliparamba
 Pariyaram
 Kuttiyeri
 Thiruvattoor
 Vellavu
 Mavichery

References

Theyyam

External links
 http://www.keralatourism.org/routes-locations/mukkunnu/id/10474
 https://en.wikipedia.org/wiki/Theyyam

Villages near Taliparamba
Villages in Kannur district